James Reimer (born 1988) is a Canadian professional ice hockey goaltender.

James Reimer may also refer to:

 A. James Reimer (1942–2010), Canadian Mennonite theologian
 James Reimer, American pastor